Saggian interchange includes a  portion of the main Lahore Ring Road, a  outfall road, a flyover, two subways and two utility culverts. The project also includes landscaping, development of service areas and bus-bays.
Mian Muhammad Shahbaz Sharif, the Punjab Chief Minister, inaugurated the Saggian Interchange, Lahore of Lahore Ring Road on 30 July 2009.

Construction details

References

External links 
The Nation (Pakistani Newspaper

Bridges in Pakistan
Road interchanges in Pakistan
Streets in Lahore